National Radiator Company may refer to:

National Radiator Company, (Johnstown, Pennsylvania, USA), later National Radiator Corporation
A number of European subsidiaries of the American Radiator Company, later under the Ideal Standard business.
Compagnie Nationale de Radiateurs in France
National Radiator Company Limited in UK
Nationale Radiator Gesellschaft mbH in Germany